José Enrique Benito y Emeterio Ysbert Alvarruiz (3 March 1886 in Madrid – 28 November 1966 in Madrid), also known as José Isbert and/or Pepe Isbert, was a Spanish actor.

Biography

Early life
In 1903 he worked at the Court of Accounts (Tribunal de Cuentas), but decided to give up working as a civil servant and that same year he made his stage debut  at the Teatro Apolo in Madrid in the play  El iluso Cañizares, changing the spelling of his real name from Y to I. He moved to the Teatro Lara, where he was very successful.

He was married to Elvira Soriano and he was father of the actress María Isbert and grandfather of Tony Isbert and Carlos Ysbert (the second Spanish voice of Homer Simpson).

Career
In 1912 he debuted in the short film Asesinato y entierro de Don José Canalejas (playing Pardiñas, the anarchist who killed José Canalejas).

During the silent era he worked in theatre with supporting roles in cinema, but with the advent of sound, he made a big screen comeback in the comedy directed by  Florián Rey, La pura verdad in (1931).

In the 1930s he acted in half a dozen films including:  ¿Cuándo te suicidas? (1931) directed by Manuel Romero (director), La bien pagada (1935) by Eusebio Fernández Ardavín or El bailarín y el trabajador (1935), directed by Luis Marquina and based on a play by Jacinto Benavente.

In the 1940s he gained great popularity in films such as Te quiero para mí (1944) and  El testamento del virrey (1944), both directed by Ladislao Vajda; Ella, él y sus millones (1944) by Juan de Orduña; El fantasma y doña Juanita (1945) by Rafael Gil and  Pacto de silencio (1949), by Antonio Román.

The films he is most remembered for are from the 1950s and 1960s, in classics directed by Luis García Berlanga: Welcome Mr. Marshall! (1953), Los jueves, milagro (1957) and El verdugo (1963); and the dark comedy masterpiece El cochecito by Marco Ferreri, all written by Rafael Azcona.

He was the grandfather in the Spanish classic La gran familia (1962), and its sequel La gran familia... y uno más (1965), these films earning him still greater popularity.

Pepe Isbert died in Madrid due to a heart condition when he was 80 years old. He was buried at Tarazona de la Mancha cemetery in the province of Albacete.

Selected filmography

 Asesinato y entierro de Don José Canalejas (1912, Short) - Manuel Pardiñas
 ¡A la orden, mi coronel! (1919)
 La mala ley (1924) - Hilario
 48 pesetas de taxi (1930)
 The Pure Truth (1931) - Sr. Lamberti
 When Do You Commit Suicide? (1932) - Petavey
 Broken Lives (1935) - Paco
 La bien pagada (1935) - Gabriel
 The Dancer and the Worker (1936) - Don Carmelo Romagosa
 Heart of Gold (1941) - El tío Matías
 El sobre lacrado (1941) - Don Casto
 Una chica de opereta (1944) - Fabián Pérez
 Orosia (1944) - Don Cándido
 Aventura (1944) - Empresario Rodríguez
 Te quiero para mí (1944) - Don Miguel
 Life Begins at Midnight (1944) - El abuelo
 El testamento del virrey (1944) - Don Prudencio
 Ella, él y sus millones (1944) - Ramón, duque de Hinojares
 The Phantom and Dona Juanita (1945) - Don Pancho
 Un hombre de negocios (1945) - Dimas
 The Princess of the Ursines (1947) - Maese Pucheros
 2 cuentos para 2 (1947) - Gordón
 Mi enemigo el doctor (1948)
 Confidencia (1948) - Don Mauricio
 The Party Goes On (1948) - M. Lapin
 Pacto de silencio (1949) - Matías Orellano
 They Always Return at Dawn (1949) - Don Jacobo
 In a Corner of Spain (1949) - Tío Tomás, el pescador
 Sin uniforme (1950) - Levi
 My Beloved Juan (1950) - Pedro
 El señor Esteve (1950) - Artista pintor
 The Vila Family (1950) - Señor Vila
 Un soltero difícil (1950) - Doctor Olmos
 Tales of the Alhambra (1950) - Don Cosme - el escribano
 Tres ladrones en la casa (1950) - Veremundo
 I Want to Marry You (1951) - Padre de Rosita
 Service at Sea (1951) - Don José
 Cielo negro (1951)
 A Cuban in Spain (1951) - Jose Holmes Pérez
 Séptima página (1951) - Vendedor de bolsos
 Captain Poison (1951) - Doctor Sánchez
 Spanish Serenade (1952) - Capitán del barco
 Lola the Coalgirl (1952) - Soldado José Rodríguez
 Cerca de la ciudad (1952) - Ramón
 The Song of Sister Maria (1952) - Labriego
 Sor intrépida (1952) - Don Cosme
 Last Day (1952) - Comisario Pérez
 Doña Francisquita (1952) - Maestro Lambertini
 Lovers of Toledo (1953) - Anticuario
 What Madness! (1953) - Don Ramiro
 Welcome Mr. Marshall! (1953) - Don Pablo, el alcalde
 Airport (1953) - Manolo
 Such is Madrid (1953) - Dimas
 Condemned to Hang (1953) - Don Félix
 Plot on the Stage (1953) - Portero
 All Is Possible in Granada (1954) - Joaquín
 Nuits andalouses (1954) - Chauffeur de taxi
 Aventuras del barbero de Sevilla (1954) - Don Faustino
 Como la tierra (1954) - Wences
 Eleven Pairs of Boots (1954) - Padre Roque
 Amor sobre ruedas (1954) - Representante Carmona
 An Andalusian Gentleman (1954) - Joaquín
 El guardián del paraíso (1955) - José
 Historias de la radio (1955) - Inventor
 Congress in Seville (1955) - Señor sordo y despistado
 Nubes de verano (1955) - Pablo
 Un día perdido (1955) - Paco
 La pícara molinera (1955) - Campillo, el pregonero
 Rapto en la ciudad (1955)
 La chica del barrio (1956) - Cipri
 Afternoon of the Bulls (1956) - Don Felipe
 Uncle Hyacynth (1956) - Sánchez
 Sucedió en mi aldea (1956) - Guardia de las barcas
 We Thieves Are Honourable (1956) - El Tío del Gabán
 The Rocket from Calabuch (1956) - Don Ramón
 Manolo, guardia urbano (1956) - Don Andrés, el sacerdote
 Miracle of the White Suit (1956) - Alcalde
 Dos novias para un torero (1956)
 Recluta con niño (1956)
 Tremolina (1957) - Don Gervasio
 Un abrigo a cuadros (1957) - Don José
 Faustina (1957) - Sacerdote - tio de Guillermo
 Fulano y Mengano (1957) - Eudosio
 Los jueves, milagro (1957) - Don José
 Los ángeles del volante (1957) - Cristóbal
 The Man Who Wagged His Tail (1957) - Pietrino
 Villa Alegre (1958) - Tío Juan
 La vida por delante (1958) - Testigo accidente
 Policarpo (1959) - Maresciallo Venanzio Frasca
 Bombas para la paz (1959) - Mauricio Dupont
 College Boarding House (1959) - Don Servando
 Litri and His Shadow (1960) - Hermano Alejandro
 Carnival Day (1960) - Don Damián
 Nothing Less Than an Archangel (1960) - Don Fabián
 El cochecito (1960) - Don Anselmo Proharán
 Vida sin risas (1960)
 Don Lucio y el hermano Pío (1960) - Hermano Pío
 An American in Toledo (1960) - Román
 Patricia mía (1961)
 Don José, Pepe y Pepito (1961) - Marcelo
 Margarita se llama mi amor (1961) - Don Severino, profesor de historia
 Despedida de soltero (1961) - Don Pablo
 Vamos a contar mentiras (1961) - Bombero
 Los que no fuimos a la guerra (1962) - Don Arístides
 You and Me Are Three (1962) - Presidente
 Sabían demasiado (1962) - Don Sebastián Guzmán, el secuestrado
 Cupido contrabandista (1962) - Recién casado
 La gran familia (1962) - El abuelo
 Perro golfo (1963) - Guarda de las obras
 El sol en el espejo (1963) - Don Pablo
 La pandilla de los once (1963) - El Duque
 El Verdugo (1963) - Amadeo, el verdugo
 Los dinamiteros (1964) - Don Benito
 Cristina (1967) - El tío
 Operación Dalila (1967) - Abuelo
 Lo que cuesta vivir (1967) - Don Antonio

References

External links
 
Biography in alohacriticon.com

1886 births
1966 deaths
Male actors from Madrid
Spanish male stage actors
Spanish male silent film actors
Spanish male film actors
20th-century Spanish male actors